The Brazilian filetail catshark (Parmaturus angelae) is a species of catshark of the family Schyliorhinidae, found in southern Brazil.

This catshark has numerous characteristics which differ from all congeners in Western Atlantic Ocean, such as proportional dimensions, vertebral counts, dorsal fins subequal, and the presence of well-developed lower and upper caudal crests of denticles. Little is known about the biology of this species, aside from its oviparous reproduction system.

References 

Brazilian filetail catshark
Fish of the Western Atlantic
Brazilian filetail catshark